Germasino was a former municipality in the Province of Como in the Italian region Lombardy, located about  north of Milan and about  northeast of Como, on the border with Switzerland. On May 16, 2011, it was annexed by Gravedona, following an act of fusion passed by Lombardy Region.

When it was disbanded, it had a population of 253 and an area of 18.2 km². Germasino bordered the municipalities of Consiglio di Rumo, Dongo, Garzeno, San Nazzaro Val Cavargna, Stazzona and, in Switzerland, Roveredo, San Vittore and Sant'Antonio.

Demographic evolution

References

Former municipalities of the Province of Como